St Vigeans Sculptured Stones Museum, located in the Angus village of St Vigeans, houses an outstanding collection of Pictish carved stones. St Vigeans, close to Arbroath, was the centre of a royal estate in the Early Middle Ages, and was of religious importance as a monastery founded in the 8th century. The present-day St Vigeans Church was built in the 12th century, on a  mound.

The museum displays 38 carved stones which formerly stood upon the old church mound. Among the stones on display is the 9th-century Drosten Stone, a flat rectangular slab with a cross carved on one side and Pictish symbols on the other, and also bearing a Pictish inscription in Latin script. The museum is managed by Historic Scotland and is housed in two adjoining sandstone cottages close to the church. The 19th-century cottages are a category B listed building.

References

External links
 Historic Environment Scotland: Visitor guide

Museums in Angus, Scotland
Pictish stones
Arbroath